Band-e Barak (also Romanized as Band-e Bāraḵ) is a village in Gowharan Rural District, Gowharan District, Bashagard County, Hormozgan Province, Iran.

Demographics
At the 2006 census, its population was 272, in 45 families.

References 

Populated places in Bashagard County